Daven "Prestige" Vanderpool is an American rap and R&B record producer. He was once a member of Bad Boy's in-house production team, "The Hitmen", and has also produced on many Bad Boy-related projects. His usual sound is a distinctive combination of funk and more heavily, electronica influences, promoted through his use of samples from Gary Numan, Dominatrix and Duran Duran. This sound is particularly heard on his productions for Jay-Z, Puff Daddy, Sauce Money, Mase, Mic Geronimo and Shyne.

Production credits

Solo
 1994: O.C. - "Point o Viewz" (with Buckwild); Word...Life
 1996: Lil' Kim - "Dreams" (Featuring Adilah);  Hard Core
 1996: Yo-Yo - "Thank You, Boo";  Total Control
 1997: LL Cool J - "Wanna Get Paid" (Featuring The Lost Boyz);  Phenomenon
 1997: Heavy D - "Waterbed Hev" (Featuring Vinia Mojica);  Waterbed Hev
 1997: Jay-Z - "Imaginary Player", "(Always Be My) Sunshine" (Featuring Babyface & Foxy Brown); In My Lifetime, Vol. 1
 1998: Cam'Ron - "Me, My Moms & Jimmy"; Confessions of Fire
 1998: McGruff - "What You Want"; Destined To Be
 1999: Mase - "No Matter What", "Do It Again" (Featuring Puff Daddy); Double Up 1999: The Notorious B.I.G. - "Big Booty Hoes" (Featuring Too Short);  Born Again 2000: Shyne - "It's Okay";  Shyne 2000: Beanie Sigel - "Die";  The TruthWith Puff Daddy
 1998: Mic Geronimo - "Nothin' Move But The Money" (Featuring Kelly Price); Vendetta 1998: Total - "Sitting Home (Waiting For You Remix)" (Featuring Shyne);  "Sitting Home" (Single)
 1999: Mase - "If You Want To Party" (Featuring Cheri Dennis); Double Up' 1999: Faith Evans - "Love Like This" (Bad Boy Remix) (Featuring Black Rob); "All Night Long" (Single)
 1999: Lil' Cease - "Don't Stop" (Featuring Puff Daddy), "My Niggaz" (Featuring Jay-Z, Bristal & Blake C.);  The Wonderful World Of Cease-a-Leo 1999: Puff Daddy - "Victory" (Hip Hop Remix) (Featuring The Notorious B.I.G. & Busta Rhymes);  "P.E. 2000" (Single)
 1999: Puff Daddy - "Do You Like It... Do You Want It..." (Featuring Jay-Z);   Forever 1999: The Notorious B.I.G. - "Notorious B.I.G." (Featuring Puff Daddy & Lil' Kim); "Would You Die 4 Me?" (Featuring Puff Daddy & Lil' Kim);  Born Again 2000: Sauce Money - "Do You See?" (Featuring Puff Daddy & Pam Long from Total); Middle Finger U.''

External links
Bad Boy Records

American rhythm and blues musicians
American record producers
Living people
Year of birth missing (living people)